The  is an electric multiple unit (EMU) commuter train type operated by the private railway operator Keihan Electric Railway in Kyoto, Japan, since 1989.

Overview 
The 7000 series was introduced in 1989 with two six-car sets and one four-car set. The remaining nine cars would be built between 1991 and 1993.

In 1993, three test 6000 series vehicles would be renumbered and incorporated into a fourth seven-car set.

These trains would be the basis for the 7000 series introduced in 1992.

Interior 
Passenger accommodation consists of longitudinal bench seating throughout.

Formations 
The seven-car trains are formed as follows, with two or three motored ("M") cars and four or five non-powered trailer ("T") cars.

 "Mc" cars are motored driving cars (with driving cabs).
 "M" cars are motored intermediate cars.
 "T" cars are unpowered trailer cars.
 The "Mc" and "M" cars each have one scissors-type pantograph along with the "7150" car.

Gallery

References

External links 

  

Electric multiple units of Japan
7200 series
Train-related introductions in 1989
Kawasaki multiple units
1500 V DC multiple units of Japan